Club Deportivo Unidad, commonly known as Deportivo Unidad, is an Equatoguinean football club based in Malabo that plays in the National League First Division. The club have won the Equatoguinean Cup twice.

Achievements
Equatoguinean Cup: 2
1999, 2000

Performance in CAF competitions
African Cup Winners' Cup: 1 appearance
2001 African Cup Winners' Cup

References

External links

:de:CD Unidad Malabo

Football clubs in Equatorial Guinea
Sport in Malabo